Anne Marie-Renée Strésor (1651—1713)  was a French painter and member of the Académie Royale de Peinture et de Sculpture. Later in life she became a nun.

Family 
Her father was the portraitist Henri Strésor.

Work 
She was accepted into the  Académie Royale de Peinture et de Sculpture in 1676. Her admission piece, a miniature of "Christ and Saint Paul on the Road to Damascus" was placed in a window nook in the academy. 

In 1687 she became a nun in Paris. She continued to produce paintings during this time.

References 

1651 births
1713 deaths
French women painters
18th-century French painters
17th-century French painters
Members of the Académie royale de peinture et de sculpture
17th-century French nuns
18th-century French nuns